Mohammed ibn Salman Al Khalifa ((1940 – 9 November 2009) was the youngest of three sons of the hakim of Bahrain, Salman bin Hamad Al Khalifa. His eldest brother, Isa bin Salman Al Khalifa, succeeded as hakim (later emir), and his other late brother, Khalifa bin Salman Al Khalifa, was the prime minister. Mohammed was uncle to the reigning king, Hamad ibn Isa Al Khalifa.

Mohammed served as minister in charge of education and customs administration.  He also served as the Chief of Police and Public Security from 1961 to 1966, and was the private owner of Umm as Sabaan island.  He was an active sponsor of sporting events, and he raised camels, horses and falcons.

Mohammed died on 9 November 2009.

Family
Mohammed was married to Sheikha Norah Al Khalifa and Sheikha bint Khalifa bin Ahmad al-Mubarak ِAl Bin Ali.  He had 11 sons and six daughters.
His sons are:
Ahmad bin Mohammad Al Khalifa
Hamad bin Mohammad Al Khalifa
Khalid bin Mohammad Al Khalifa
Khalifa bin Mohammad Al Khalifa
Salman bin Mohammed Al Khalifa
Abdullah bin Mohammad Al Khalifa
Sultan bin Mohammad Al Khalifa
Hashim bin Mohammad Al Khalifa
Muhammad bin Hashim Al Khalifa
Nadir bin Mohammad Al Khalifa
Ali bin Mohammad Al Khalifa

References

Mohammed Bin Salman
2009 deaths
Year of birth unknown
1940 births
Sons of monarchs